= Finland Saga =

Japanese manga series

- First tankōbon volume cover

フィンランド・サガ（性） (Finrando Saga (Sei))
- Manga
- Written by: Takashi Yoshida
- Published by: Kodansha
- Imprint: Morning KC
- Magazine: Monthly Morning Two
- Original run: February 21, 2009 – April 22, 2011
- Volumes: 3
- icon

Finland Saga (Japanese: フィンランド・サガ（性）, Hepburn: Finrando Saga (Sei)) is a Japanese manga series written and illustrated by Takashi Yoshida. It was serialized in Kodansha's seinen manga magazine Monthly Morning Two from February 2009 to April 2011, with its chapters collected in three tankōbon volumes.

== Publication ==
Written and illustrated by Takashi Yoshida. It was serialized in Kodansha's seinen manga magazine Monthly Morning Two from February 21, 2009, to April 22, 2011. Kodansha collected its chapters in three tankōbon volumes, released from January 22, 2010, to June 23, 2011.

=== Volumes ===
No.	Japanese release date	Japanese ISBN
1	January 22, 2010	978-4-06-372874-3
2	November 22, 2010	978-4-06-372957-3
3	June 23, 2011	978-4-06-387018-3
